Eric Hagg (born September 15, 1989) is a former American football safety. He was drafted by the Cleveland Browns in the seventh round of the 2011 NFL Draft. He played college football at Nebraska, and high school football in Arizona at Ironwood High School.

Professional career

Cleveland Browns
Hagg was selected by the Cleveland Browns in the 2011 NFL Draft with their 7th round pick. He was released on May 21, 2013.

Hagg played in 10 games for the Cleveland Browns as a rookie after being injured in training camp. He finished his rookie season with 11 tackles and 1 pass deflection.

Denver Broncos
Hagg signed a future contract with the Denver Broncos in January 2014. On July 21, 2014, he retired from football.

References

External links
 
 Nebraska Cornhuskers bio
 NFL.com bio

1989 births
Living people
People from Peoria, Arizona
Sportspeople from the Phoenix metropolitan area
Players of American football from Arizona
American football safeties
American football cornerbacks
Nebraska Cornhuskers football players
Cleveland Browns players
Denver Broncos players